The Second Guangzhou–Shenzhen high-speed railway is a planned high-speed railway line in Guangdong, China. It will link Guangzhou and Shenzhen.

Specification
The proposed route starts at Guangzhou North railway station and passes through Baiyun Airport Terminal 3, Yuzhu, Dongguan, and ends at Shenzhen Airport railway station.

Significance
This line will become the second  route between Guangzhou and Shenzhen, following the Guangzhou to Shenzhen section of the Guangzhou–Shenzhen–Hong Kong Express Rail Link, which opened in 2011. The slower Guangzhou–Shenzhen railway also connects the two cities.

References

High-speed railway lines in China
Proposed railway lines in China